Arizona Center is a shopping center and office complex located in downtown Phoenix, Arizona.

Layout 
Arizona Center features two office buildings, retail and a 24-screen AMC theatre.

It was completed in 1989. This tower houses various legal firms with Snell and Wilmer being the largest. Other tenants include the Greater Phoenix Convention and Visitor's Bureau (PHX CVB) and the main corporate offices of the Harlem Globetrotters.

It was completed in 1990 and is the headquarters of local electric utility Arizona Public Service or APS.

Retail offers a variety of restaurants, boutiques and tourist shops.

The large central plaza at Arizona Center includes richly landscaped courtyards and fountains designed by SWA Group, which won a National Merit Award by the American Society of Landscape Architects for its work on the plaza.

Nearby, a 30-story Sheraton Phoenix Downtown hotel opened in the fall of 2008. Also, several high-end condominium projects in the downtown area are under construction, newly opened, or in the planning stages.

History 
Arizona Center was designed by The Rouse Company (on its festival marketplace model, which worked to great success in other cities) and opened in the fall of 1990 to great fanfare and high expectations, as it was considered one of the original components of the ongoing downtown revitalization efforts in Phoenix taking place since the early 1990s.

The expectations were high since it was developed by the same firm that created the highly successful Faneuil Hall Marketplace (Boston) and Harborplace (Baltimore). Arizona Center was expected to be a retail, dining and entertainment magnet which would jump-start interest in downtown redevelopment, but some critics felt suburban-oriented Phoenix was not ready to embrace a downtown development of this caliber. Critics have also pointed out the relative scarcity of permanent upscale apartment and/or condominium housing in the immediate vicinity as a factor in the lackluster performance of the mall. Most of the residential districts surrounding the downtown area are middle-to-lower income, not adequate to support the middle-to-high-end marketing mix that Arizona Center set out to provide.

Many of the initial retailers struggled to attract customers, and by 2003, the large second-story food court, similar to those found in suburban shopping malls, was closed and reconfigured into the Phoenix regional office of Detroit-based architectural firm SmithGroup.

The Rouse Company was acquired by General Growth Properties in 2004. After going through bankruptcy, GGP sold Arizona Center to CommonWealth REIT in 2011.

Arizona Center underwent a major renovation from 2017 to 2019.

The Arizona Center took huge hits from Covid in 2020 and 2021. The white collar office workers from the One Arizona Center, the APS high rise, and other downtown Phoenix office buildings started to work from home during the pandemic and have never fully come back. The Arizona Center lost 12 restaurants and all retail establishments during that period, including big hitters like Starbucks, Hooters, and Subway. The complex is now struggling as foot traffic fell to almost nothing. The local management office admittedly does not expect to see foot traffic revive for several more years.

See also

Downtown Phoenix
List of historic properties in Phoenix, Arizona

References

External links
AZ Center – Shop, Dine, Live in the Heart of Downtown Phoenix
Arizona Public Service homepage
Help Center – The Arizona Republic
This is Phoenix, Arizona

Skyscraper office buildings in Phoenix, Arizona
Buildings and structures completed in 1990
Brookfield Properties
Retail buildings in Phoenix, Arizona
HKS, Inc. buildings